Simon Worrall is an English rugby league footballer for Toulouse Olympique in the Co-operative Championship he previously played for Leeds Rhinos and rugby union for Leeds Carnegie.

His usual position is second row or at loose-forward.

He made his début in a win over Harlequins RL in March 2008.

References

External links
Toulouse Olympique profile
(archived by archive.is) Toulouse Olympique press release: "Simon Worrall, a Leeds Rhinos signs for Toulouse"
Yorkshire Evening Post: "Leeds Rhinos Worrall gearing up for French experience"

1984 births
Living people
English rugby league players
English rugby union players
Leeds Rhinos players
Leeds Tykes players
Rugby league players from Doncaster
Rugby league second-rows
Rugby union players from Doncaster
Toulouse Olympique players